Tomboye is a locality in the Queanbeyan–Palerang Regional Council, New South Wales, Australia. It is located on the north side of the Mongarlowe River on the road from Braidwood to Nowra about 28 km north of Braidwood and 93 km southwest of Nowra. It consists mainly of forest and grazing country.

Tomboye had a "half-time" school from 1867 to 1879. Up to June 1893, it was called Jamboye school.

References

Localities in New South Wales
Queanbeyan–Palerang Regional Council
Southern Tablelands